The Cleveland School, also known as Cleveland Middle School, is a historic school complex located near Clayton, Johnston County, North Carolina.  It was designed by architect Charles C. Hook and built in 1926–1927, with flanking wings added in 1932 and 1938.  It is a two-story, five bay, "U"-shaped, Classical Revival style brick building on a raised basement. It features a projecting center bay with recessed main
entrance and end bays with blind windows. Also on the property are the contributing well house (c. 1927), bathroom (c. 1927), and gymnasium (1955).

It was listed on the National Register of Historic Places in 2005.

References

School buildings on the National Register of Historic Places in North Carolina
Neoclassical architecture in North Carolina
School buildings completed in 1927
Buildings and structures in Johnston County, North Carolina
National Register of Historic Places in Johnston County, North Carolina
1927 establishments in North Carolina